Jean-François Abeloos (1819–1886) was a Belgian sculptor and art educator.

Life

Abeloos was born in Leuven on 14 December 1819, the son of Pierre Abeloos and Catherine Van den Put. He trained as a sculptor under Karel Geerts at the Leuven Academy of Fine Arts, as did his younger brother Michaël Abeloos. In 1855, he succeeded Geerts. He was also a practising sculptor, exhibiting a Madonna and a St. Cecilia at the Brussels Salon of 1854 and working on the restoration of Leuven Town Hall around 1860. He was particularly active producing statues for churches. He died in Leuven on 6 August 1886.

References

1819 births
1886 deaths
Artists from Leuven
19th-century Belgian sculptors
19th-century Belgian male artists
Art educators